Kediri can refer to:
 Kediri (historical kingdom), a medieval kingdom occupying territory in present-day Indonesia
 Kediri (city), a modern-day city in East Java, Indonesia
 The Kediri meteorite of c. 1940, which fell in East Java, Indonesia (see meteorite falls)
 Kediri Regency, a kabupaten in East Java, Indonesia
 Kediri, Bali, a district (kecamatan) of Bali, Indonesia
 Persedikab Kediri, an association football club based in Kediri Regency
 Persik Kediri, an association football club based in Kediri, East Java